Dudley is a town in Worcester County, Massachusetts, United States. The population was 11,921 at the 2020 census.

History
Dudley was first settled in 1714 and was officially incorporated in 1732. The town was named for landholders Paul and William Dudley.

In April 1776, on his way to New York City from Boston after his victory in the Siege of Boston, General George Washington camped in the town of Dudley with the Continental Army along what is now a portion of Route 31 near the Connecticut border. During the trip, it is rumored that a "large cache" of captured and recovered British weaponry and supplies was ordered "concealed in the grounds" in the rural area along the route. The cache, hidden to resupply reinforcements from Massachusetts or to cover a retreat from the south, was never used or recorded as having been recovered.

Union soldiers from Dudley, the 15th Regiment Massachusetts Volunteer Infantry, suffered heavy casualties inflicted by the Confederacy during the Battle of Gettysburg. Dudley was the primary manufacturer of "Brogan boots" worn by the Union Army and produced the majority of the standard issue Union uniforms worn during the Civil War.

Cemetery controversy

Geography
Dudley is bounded on the northeast by Oxford, on the north by Charlton, on the west by Southbridge, on the south by Woodstock and Thompson, Connecticut, and on the east by Webster, with which it traditionally had the closest cultural and political relations.

Demographics

As of the census of 2000, there were 10,036 people, 3,737 households, and 2,668 families residing in the town. The racial makeup of the town was 96.83% White, 0.23%African American, 0.23% Native American, 0.74% Asian, 0.75% from other races, and 0.97% from two or more races. Hispanic or Latino of any race were 2.01% of the population.

There were 3,737 households, out of which 34.5% had children under the age of 18 living with them, 57.5% were married couples living together, 10.5% had a female householder with no husband present, and 28.6% were non-families. 23.5% of all households were made up of individuals, and 10.5% had someone living alone who was 65 years of age or older. The average household size was 2.57 and the average family size was 3.04.

In the town, the population was spread out, with 24.7% under the age of 18, 10.6% from 18 to 24, 29.9% from 25 to 44, 22.0% from 45 to 64, and 12.8% who were 65 years of age or older. The median age was 36 years. For every 100 females, there were 98.2 males. For every 100 females age 18 and over, there were 96.0 males.

The median income for a household in the town was $48,602, and the median income for a family was $59,309. Males had a median income of $40,337 versus $27,589 for females. The per capita income for the town was $21,546. About 3.1% of families and 5.6% of the population were below the poverty line, including 4.2% of those under age 18 and 10.1% of those age 65 or over.

Government

Library

The public library in Dudley opened in 1897. The library has changed location a few times since then, and in the early 21st century, a new building was constructed over the site of the former town hall, which had also been relocated. In fiscal year 2008, the town of Dudley spent 1.44% ($163,468) of its budget on its public library, approximately $14 per person.

Education

Dudley is the home of Nichols College, which maintains a campus on Dudley Hill, the historical center of the town. Public schools in Dudley include Mason Road School (grades Pre-K–1), Dudley Elementary School (grades 2–4), Dudley Middle School (grades 5–8) and Shepherd Hill Regional High School (grades 9–12), the last of which also serves students from Charlton. All public schools in Dudley are part of the Dudley-Charlton Regional School District. Dudley is one of ten towns whose students have the option of attending Bay Path Regional Vocational Technical High School (grades 9–12).

Historic Places
Black Tavern (1803)
Stevens Linen Works Historic District

Notable people

 James Blood, Civil War officer and Victoria Woodhull's second husband (suffragist and first female Presidential nominee)
 Jacob P. Chamberlain, former US Congressman
 Chris Lindstrom is an American football guard with the Atlanta Falcons in the National Football League
 Leo Martello, Wiccan priest and civil rights activist
 William Whiting II, former US Congressman, paper industrialist, philanthropist

References

External links

Dudley official website

 
Towns in Worcester County, Massachusetts
Towns in Massachusetts